Karl Adams may refer to:

Karl Adams (mathematician) (1811–1849), Swiss mathematician 
Karl Adams (baseball) (1891–1967), American baseball player

See also
Carl Adams (disambiguation)
Karl Adam (disambiguation)